Beckrath  is a village in North Rhine-Westphalia, Germany,  west of Berlin and  south of Mönchengladbach.

External links 
  © 2006 - 2011 retrieved  2011-08-29 (website shows map location plus geographical information,weather,distances to other settlements in the area)

Villages in North Rhine-Westphalia